Tisis imperatrix is a moth in the family Lecithoceridae. It was described by Edward Meyrick in 1910. It is found on Borneo.

The wingspan is about 20 mm. The forewings are bright deep coppery purple, with strong indigo-blue reflections. The hindwings are dark purple fuscous.

References

Moths described in 1910
Tisis